Usha Thakur (born 3 February 1966) is an Indian politician and a member of Madhya Pradesh Legislative Assembly. She belongs to Bharatiya Janata Party. She is the current Cabinet Minister in the Government of Madhya Pradesh.

Early life and education
Usha Thakur was born in Indore in an average middle-class family. She developed interest in poetry and Hindi literature from childhood and later pursued an M.A. in History. She also sings Bhajan in religious ceremonies and is very vocal on her views on women.

Controversies
Usha Thakur courted controversy by supporting banning of Muslim youths from Navratra Garba venues, alleging that Muslim youths court Hindu girls with a ploy to convert them to Islam. She also urged all the garba organizers in her constituency to verify the identities of all the entrants using their voter IDs.
	
On 25 September 2015, she said that Muslims should sacrifice their sons instead of goats if they value the qurbani festival.

References

Living people
People from Indore
1966 births
Women in Madhya Pradesh politics
Madhya Pradesh politicians
Bharatiya Janata Party politicians from Madhya Pradesh
21st-century Indian women politicians
21st-century Indian politicians
Politicians from Indore